James Reynolds (born 1953) studied contemporary music under John Adams, as well as percussion at the San Francisco Conservatory of Music and composition in Cologne under Michael von Biel. Informed by many different influences – from Neue Musik, Broadway and European music theatre to avant-garde synthpop – Reynolds’ compositions explore the combination of words, sounds and images. He was Composer in Residence at the Stiftung Laurenz-Haus in Basel and Visiting Artist at the University of California, Santa Barbara. For over three decades, he has written music for literary productions, thrillers, fairytales and children’s radio plays for West German Radio (WDR/Cologne). His compositions for music theatre, dance-theatre, film and television productions are performed and broadcast for and to an international audience.

James Reynolds lives in Berlin.

Productions (selected)

Music theatre 
 POE- Dreamworlds (Melodram) Stadttheater Bremerhaven, Bremerhavener Symphoniker 2019
 
 Ghost Knight, Deutsche Oper am Rhein Duisburg & Düsseldorf 2019
 Ghost Knight, Opera Bonn 2017  
 Tucholskys Spiegel, Chamber Opera Festival Rheinsberg 2017  
 A Throw of the dice will never abolish chance, Sydney Conservatory of Music 2017  
 Das Moses-Jahwe-Projekt, WDR Köln 2005  
 Vergeltung, WDR Köln 2003  
 Die Prozedur, WDR Köln   
 Fantasy1, Viola d’amore Society New York, HR Frankfurt 1987

Theatre and dance 
 Sammlung Prinzhorn, Theater Heidelberg 
 Über das Marionettentheater, Accor Festival for Alternative Theatre, Israel
 Fürst Pücklers Utopia, Staatstheater Cottbus
 Felix Nussbaum, Stadttheater Osnabrück
 Die Bibel als Theater, Stadttheater Bern, Jewish Museum New York, Accor Festival for Alternative Theatre in Israel
 Maestro, Salzburger Landestheater
 Amerika, Theater Bremen
 RATS, Bonn Opera
 Tanzmarathon, Bonn Opera
 Die Mäusehochzeit w/ Michael Villmow, Opera Cologne, Philharmonie Cologne

Films 
 Der Schatz von Timbuktu - eine Rettungsgeschichte, Arte 2016
 Der Vietnam Krieg: Gesichter einer Tragödie, ARD (Gold World Medal, New York Festivals 2016) 2015
 Frauen und Ozeane, Arte 2015
 Geliebte Feinde, Arte (episodes 3-5-8-9) 2013/2014
 Auf Expeditionsreise nach Madagaskar, Arte 2013
 Auf Expeditionsreise durch Australien, Arte 2013
 Auf Expeditionsreise durch Tansania, Arte 2013
 Auf Expeditionsreise an die Küste Costa Ricas, Arte 2013
 Verborgenes Venedig, Arte 2012
 Das Land der Dogon, Arte 2012
 Opfer und Verführer, Arte 2010
 Wohin treibt der Islam, ZDF 2010
 Akte Theo: Ungelöst - Eine Baseler Spurensuche, Arte 2010
 Chaim (Winner Short Tiger Filmpreis München, Winner "Best Docu", Woodstock Film Festival) 2006 / 2007

Radio plays 
 Illegal, Deutschlandfunk 2017
 Der Untergang Jerusalems, WDR 2015 / 2016
 GastSpiele, WDR, Funkhaus Europa 2015  
 Narrenteufel, WDR 2007
 Aladin, WDR 2007
 Gilgamesch, WDR 2006
 Moses und die Wüste der Wunder, WDR 2004
 Salammbô, WDR 2004
 Ein Job, WDR 2003
 Lügen im Dunkeln, WDR 2002
 Die Räuber von Liang Schan Moor, WDR 2004
 Die Legende vom heiligen Trinker, WDR 2002
 Das Bildnis des Dorian Gray, WDR 2000
 Die Prozedur, WDR 2000
 Die letzte Reise der Titanic, WDR, NDR, HR 2000
 Odysseus, WDR

External links
Website James Reynolds (http://www.jamesreynolds.de/)
Biography James Reynolds (http://www.stadttheaterbern.ch/363-james-reynolds.html)

Living people
1953 births
Place of birth missing (living people)